Cork South-West is a parliamentary constituency represented in Dáil Éireann, the lower house of the Irish parliament or Oireachtas. The constituency elects 3 deputies (Teachtaí Dála, commonly known as TDs) on the system of proportional representation by means of the single transferable vote (PR-STV).

History and boundaries
It is a largely rural constituency, running from Dursey Island in the west to Ringabella in the east, with many medium-sized towns, including Bandon, Bantry, Clonakilty, Kinsale and Skibbereen.

It was first used at the 1961 general election. The Electoral (Amendment) (Dáil Constituencies) Act 2017 defines the constituency as:

TDs

Elections

2020 general election

2016 general election

2011 general election

2007 general election

2002 general election

1997 general election

1992 general election

1989 general election

1987 general election

November 1982 general election

February 1982 general election

1981 general election

1977 general election

1973 general election

1969 general election

1965 general election

1961 general election

See also
Elections in the Republic of Ireland
Politics of the Republic of Ireland
List of Dáil by-elections
List of political parties in the Republic of Ireland

References

External links
 Oireachtas Constituency Dashboards
 Oireachtas Members Database
 Government of Ireland: Constituency Maps (Current)

Dáil constituencies
Politics of County Cork
1961 establishments in Ireland
Constituencies established in 1961